The Battle of Saunshi was fought between the Sultanate of Mysore and the Maratha Empire in 1777. Hyder Ali attempted to try to regain his lost territories of Malabar and Coorg from the Marathas and was successful in doing so. Hyder Ali decided to attack the Marathas at Saunshi. Hyder Ali sent his trusted general Muhammad Ali to attack the Maratha garrison stationed at Saunshi. The result of the battle was a decisive victory for Mysore and Hyder Ali against the Maratha forces. Maratha Chief Konher Rao was killed in the battle and Padurang Rao was captured and taken as a prisoner by the Mysore forces.

References

Saunshi
Saunshi
Saunshi
1777 in India